Steen Rømer Larsen (born 24 February 1949) is a Danish former footballer who played as a striker.

He was the top goalscorer of the 1969 Danish football championship, where he was part of the team who won the championship. He then moved abroad to play professionally for FC Nantes and Union St. Gilloise in France and Belgium.

Steen Rømer played eight games and scored four goals for the Denmark national football team. Two of the goals was scored in his debut against Norway. Additionally he had 8 caps for various youth national teams.

References

External links
Danish national team profile

1949 births
Living people
Association football forwards
Danish men's footballers
Denmark international footballers
Danish expatriate men's footballers
Expatriate footballers in France
Boldklubben 1903 players
FC Nantes players
Royale Union Saint-Gilloise players
Ligue 1 players